Godbrange is a village in the commune of Junglinster, in central Luxembourg.  , the village has a population of 574 inhabitants.

References

Junglinster
Towns in Luxembourg